The position of Linacre Professor of Zoology at the University of Oxford was founded in 1860, initially as the Linacre Professorship of Physiology and then as the chair of Human and Comparative Anatomy, although its origins can be traced back a further 300 years, to the Linacre Lectureships at Merton College. The post is attached to a fellowship at Merton.

It is named in honour of Thomas Linacre (1460–1524), Physician to Henry VIII and founder of the Royal College of Physicians.

The Linacre Professor is on the Board of Management for the J.W.Jenkinson Memorial Lectureship.

List of Linacre professors

 1860–1881 George Rolleston
 1881–1891 Henry Nottidge Moseley
 1891–1898 Sir Edwin Ray Lankester
 1899–1906 Walter F.R. Weldon
 1906–1921 Gilbert C. Bourne
 1921–1946 Edwin Stephen Goodrich
 1946–1961 Sir Alister Hardy
 1961–1979 John William Sutton Pringle
 1979–1993 Sir Richard Southwood
 1993–2000 Sir Roy Anderson
 2002– Peter W. H. Holland

References

External links
 Linacre Professors of Zoology
 Department of Zoology, Oxford University

Professorships at the University of Oxford
Professorships in zoology
1860 establishments in the United Kingdom
Merton College, Oxford
Lists of people associated with the University of Oxford